Hamoud Fleitah Al-Shemmari (born 26 September 1960) is a Kuwaiti football defender who played for Kuwait in the 1982 FIFA World Cup. He also played for Kazma Sporting Club.

References

External links
FIFA profile

1960 births
Kuwaiti footballers
Kuwait international footballers
Association football defenders
1982 FIFA World Cup players
Living people
Olympic footballers of Kuwait
Footballers at the 1980 Summer Olympics
Asian Games medalists in football
Footballers at the 1982 Asian Games
Footballers at the 1986 Asian Games
1980 AFC Asian Cup players
1984 AFC Asian Cup players
AFC Asian Cup-winning players
Asian Games silver medalists for Kuwait
Medalists at the 1982 Asian Games
Kazma SC players
Kuwait Premier League players